Jennie Irene Mix (1862–1925) was a music critic, journalist, novelist, and editor.

Early life
She was born in Cleveland, Ohio, to Lorenzo Dow Mix and Jane Sylvia Gardner.  She studied classical music in Cleveland, New York, and Germany, and then pursued a career in journalism.

Career

She was a trained classical pianist, and later worked as a music critic for the Toledo Times and book review editor and critic for the Pittsburgh Post. During the 1920s when radio was reaching broad popularity, she was one of only a few female editors covering radio in journalism, working as an editor at Radio Broadcast (Magazine) from 1924 until her death in April 1925.  She authored a column entitled "The Listeners' Point of View" in Radio Broadcast that discussed radio broadcast programs, especially relating to music.

Mix also wrote books on several topics, including a popular novel, At Fame's Gateway; the Romance of a Pianiste, Mighty Animals: Being Short Talks About Some of the Animals Which Lived on This Earth Before Man Appeared, and Great Pictures and Their Painters: A Series of Articles on Some of the Medici Prints Owned by the Carnegie Library of Pittsburgh.

Mighty Animals was an apparent departure from previous writing topics.  It was one of the first texts on paleontology written for children.  It includes a foreword by the director of the American Museum of Natural History, Dr. Frederic Lucas. The book discusses various types of extinct animals (primarily dinosaurs), how fossils are formed, and how field work is conducted, and contains numerous illustrations and photographs.

Death
Jennie Irene Mix died on April 26, 1925 in Toledo, Ohio.

References 

1862 births
1925 deaths
Novelists from Ohio
American music critics
American women music critics
American editors
American women editors
American journalists
American women journalists